"Two Different Worlds" is a popular song with music by Al Frisch and the lyrics by Sid Wayne, published in 1956.

Notable recordings
The biggest U.S. hit version was recorded by Don Rondo.  It reached number 19 on the Billboard chart and number 12 on the Cashbox chart.
A cover version of the song was recorded by Roger Williams and Jane Morgan which reached number 41 on the Billboard chart. 
A recording by Ronnie Hilton in the same year reached number 13 on the UK Singles Chart.
In 1965, Lenny Welch recorded the song peaking at number 6 on the Easy Listening chart and number 61 on the Hot 100.

Other recordings
Nat King Cole also recorded the song in 1956 but without chart success. 
A recording by Jerry Vale in 1963, appeared on the original Columbia album, The Language of Love. 
Sammy Davis Jr. covered the song in his 1966 album Sammy Davis Jr. Sings and Laurindo Almeida Plays
The British pop singer  Engelbert Humperdinck also covered the song on his 1967 album The Last Waltz. 
Earl Coleman recorded a version with a quartet led by Sonny Rollins. The cut appeared on Rollins's album, Tour de Force.

References

1956 songs
Songs written by Sid Wayne